Devi is a village in Mansehra District in the Khyber-Pakhtunkhwa province of Pakistan. It is located at 34°20'30N 73°1'40E with an altitude of 964 metres (3166 feet).

References

Populated places in Mansehra District